"On Chill" is a song by American rapper Wale featuring Jeremih, released through Warner Records as the lead single from Wale's sixth studio album Wow... That's Crazy on July 12, 2019. It reached number 22 on the US Billboard Hot 100.

Background
The song samples the keyboards from Raphael Saadiq's 1995 song "Ask of You", which was said to give it an "old-school R&B feel".

Critical reception
Writing for Billboard, Heran Mamo called the track "a stalled apology and a plea to simmer things down verbally while heating things up physically". Emily Zemler of Rolling Stone described the song as "slick" and "sultry". Alexis Reese of Vibe wrote that "Jeremih takes over the chorus and bridge, melodically singing sweet nothings about tragedy, reconciling and being 'on chill'" and felt that "Wale successfully amplifies his established R&B-rap vibes".

Commercial performance
On Chill peaked at number 22 on the US Billboard Hot 100, becoming his highest charting single since "Bad" in 2013 and second highest of his career. On September 22, 2020, the single was certified double platinum by the Recording Industry Association of America (RIAA) for combined sales and streaming equivalent units of over two million units in the United States.

Charts

Weekly charts

Year-end charts

Certifications

References

2019 singles
2019 songs
Wale (rapper) songs
Jeremih songs
Songs written by Eric Bellinger
Songs written by Jeremih
Songs written by Wale (rapper)